An ironclad is a wooden ship, or ship of composite construction, sheathed with thick iron plates.

Ironclad may also refer to:
Casemate ironclad, a particular type of ironclad warship in use during the American Civil War-era
Ironclad (film), a 2011 action film
Ironclad (game), a 1973 miniatures wargaming series by Guidon Games 
Ironclad (video game), a video game for the Neo Geo CD console
Ironclad (comics), a Marvel comic book supervillain
"Ironclad", a song by Sleater-Kinney from All Hands on the Bad One
"Ironclad", a song by Yngwie Malmsteen from Attack!!
Ironclads (film), a 1991 TNT television film
Ironclads: American Civil War, a computer game
Ironclads: High Seas, a computer game
Operation Ironclad or the Battle of Madagascar, the World War II British occupation of Diego Suarez, Madagascar 
Ironclad Games, a video game developer
Legio VI Ferrata (Legion 6 Ironclad),  a Roman legion
Ironclad, a steam locomotive on the Keighley and Worth Valley Railway

See also